Kaupilovo, was a railway station near St. Petersburg, Russia, in 1894-1928.

The station opened on November 26, 1894, when the Primorskaya line was extended from station Razdelnaya to Sestroretsk. It was located on continuation of modern Voyennaya street, after the floods of 1924, data on station usage is not available.

References 

Railway stations opened in 1894
Railway stations closed in 1928